XIV Corps or Fire and Fury Corps is a corps of the Indian Army. It is a part of the Army's Udhampur-based Northern Command. The 14 Corps looks after military deployment along Kargil-Leh and looks after the frontiers with China, Pakistan and also guards the Siachen Glacier.

History 
The 3rd Division was raised in 1962 even as the disastrous war was underway, from elements of HQ Nagaland and kept as an Eastern Command reserve, even though it almost always remained on CI duty. After near 30 years in Eastern, the division left the theater two decades ago for Ladakh and never returned. While on CI duty, the division was pulled out and sent to fight Pakistani infiltrators in the Matayan-Dras sectors. Then when HQ XIV Corps was raised, it took over the 3rd and 8th Division.

During the Kargil War it consisted of 56th Mountain Brigade, usually stationed at Matayan, 79th Mountain Brigade, usually stationed at Dras, and 192nd Mountain Brigade.

Exercise Changthang Prahar an Integrated Exercise of all Arms in Super High Altitude Area was conducted in September 2019.

Order of battle 

3rd Infantry Division (Trishul Division) - The division was created in October 1962 in Ladakh. It fought in the Indo-Pakistani War of 1965. In 1991, it was part of XV Corps. It is headquartered at Karu, 40 km from Leh. During the Kargil War, the division consisted of the 3rd Artillery Brigade (the normally assigned divisional artillery), 70th Infantry Brigade, reassigned from Demchok, Ladakh on the Chinese border, and 102nd Infantry Brigade, both normally assigned to the division. It presently is responsible for security of the entire eastern Ladakh LAC with China. The division has three infantry brigades stationed at Tangste, Kairi and Daulat Beg Oldie (DBO) under it along with an artillery brigade.
8th Mountain Division - (Forever in Operations Division) - It was raised in 1963 to carry out counter insurgency operations in Nagaland. Until 1990, it was headquartered at Kohima under III Corps. As trouble erupted in Kashmir in the late 1980s, the division was moved to the Kashmir Valley, making it the spearhead of the counter-insurgency operations. During the Kargil War, it was rushed into the Kargil-Drass and Batalik sectors from Kashmir Valley, where it proved its mettle. It is presently tasked to look after the LoC.
102 (Independent) Infantry Brigade (Siachen Brigade)
118 (Independent) Infantry Brigade (Parashu Brigade)
254 (Independent) Armoured Brigade (Snow Leopard Brigade)
The High Altitude Medical Research Centre (HAMRC), 153 General Hospital of the 14 Corps, is the highest multi-specialty hospital in the world along with 14 Corps Dental Unit being the highest multi-speciality dental unit in the world providing treatment in extreme climatic conditions.

List of commanders

References 

014
Military units and formations established in 1999
1999 establishments in India